Reisterstown Historic District is a national historic district in Reisterstown, Baltimore County, Maryland, United States. Its development is inseparably identified with the roads that converge to form Main Street.  They are Maryland Route 30 and Maryland Route 140. The earliest structures, including several of log, date to the late 18th century, although the town was founded in 1758. It developed as a convenient stopping place for weary travelers from the outer reaches of Western Maryland or Pennsylvania and many businesses catered to the traveler: including taverns and inns, smithshops, saddleries, stables, waggoners.

It was added to the National Register of Historic Places in 1979.

References

External links
, including photo from 2006, at Maryland Historical Trust
Boundary Map of the Reisterstown Historic District, Baltimore County, at Maryland Historical Trust

Historic districts in Baltimore County, Maryland
Victorian architecture in Maryland
Historic districts on the National Register of Historic Places in Maryland
Reisterstown, Maryland
National Register of Historic Places in Baltimore County, Maryland